The UB II type submarine was a class of U-boat built during World War I by the German Imperial Navy. They were enlarged from the preceding type UB I and were more effective vessels. The boats were a single hull design with a 50-metre maximum diving depth and a 30-45 second diving time. In 1915 and 1916, 30 were built at two different shipyards.

The design of type UB II addressed many of the problems apparent in the preceding type UB I class. The UB II boats featured a two-shaft drive with a much larger battery capacity and larger engines. Storage batteries were placed forward of the central diving tanks to compensate for the much heavier engine installation.

The armament of the type UB II consisted of 50 cm G torpedoes launched from two bow tubes. The torpedo tubes were installed one above the other to allow for a bow design that would create optimal surface efficiency. A 5 cm gun was provided on the deck for surface use.

The weight of the boat was increased to 270 tons of surface displacement to accommodate these improvements. Saddle tanks were fitted to the sides of the pressure hull to allow greater fuel storage area.

List of Type UB II submarines 
There were 30 Type UB II submarines commissioned into the German Imperial Navy.

  - Mined December 1917
  - Sunk by Q-ship Penshurst November 1916
  - Sunk by aircraft July 1917
  - Foundered on way to breakers 1920
  - Mined January 1918
  - Broken up 1921
  - Broken up 1921
  - Broken up 1922
  - Sunk and raised by French Navy repaired as Roland Morillot BU 1931
  - Sunk by  July 1917
  - Broken up 1919
  - Sunk by HM trawler John Gillman August 1918
  - Sunk by ASW drifter May 1918
  - Sunk by aircraft September 1917
  - Mined April 1918
  - Broken up 1922
  - Sunk by  January 1918
  - Rammed and sunk by SS Molière May 1917
  - Sunk by Q-ship Penshurst January 1917
  - Mined February 1918
  - Mined May 1917
  - Scuttled October 1918
  - Broken up 1920
  - Broken up 1919
  - Broken up 1919
  - Sunk by British surface ships August 1916
  - Mined 1916
  - Mined 1916. Wreck raised in 1993 and put on display in Çanakkale Turkey. 
  - Broken up 1919

Notes

References

Bibliography
 Conway's All the World's Fighting Ships 1906–1921

 

Submarine classes
 
World War I submarines of Germany